Radiogram may refer to:

Radiogram (message), a telegram style message transmitted by radio
Radiogram (device), a piece of furniture combining a radio with an amplified gramophone
Radiogram (album), a 2001 comedy album by The Bob and Tom Show
Radiogram (medicine), a photographic image produced on a radiosensitive surface by radiation other than visible light (especially by X-rays or gamma rays)